The 1997 Auburn Tigers football team represented Auburn University in the 1997 NCAA Division I-A football season.  The team, coached by Terry Bowden, finished with a 10–3 record and won the school's first SEC West Division championship, but lost by a point to Tennessee in the 1997 SEC Championship Game. The Tigers ended the season with a #11 ranking in the AP Poll and the Coaches' Poll after winning the Peach Bowl against Clemson on January 2.

Schedule

Season summary

Florida

at Auburn

References

Auburn
Auburn Tigers football seasons
Peach Bowl champion seasons
Auburn Tigers football